The 2013 TEAN International was a professional tennis tournament played on outdoor clay courts. It was the 18th edition of the tournament which was part of the 2013 ATP Challenger Tour and the 13th edition of the tournament for the 2013 ITF Women's Circuit. It took place in Alphen aan den Rijn, Netherlands, on 2–8 September 2013.

ATP singles main draw entrants

Seeds 

 1 Rankings as of 26 August 2013

Other entrants 
The following players received wildcards into the singles main draw:
  Thiemo de Bakker
  Wesley Koolhof
  Miliaan Niesten
  Jelle Sels

The following players received entry from the qualifying draw:
  Richard Becker
  Alban Meuffels
  Marek Michalička
  Peter Torebko

WTA singles main draw entrants

Seeds 

 1 Rankings as of 26 August 2013

Other entrants 
The following players received wildcards into the singles main draw:
  Angelique van der Meet
  Valeria Podda
  Arantxa Rus
  Mandy Wagemaker

The following players received entry from the qualifying draw:
  Iryna Brémond
  Lucía Cervera Vázquez
  Justine Ozga
  Bernarda Pera
  Sviatlana Pirazhenka
  Bernice van de Velde
  Eva Wacanno
  Monique Zuur

The following player received entry into the singles main draw as a lucky loser:
  Gabriela van de Graaf

Champions

Men's singles 

  Daniel Gimeno-Traver def.  Thomas Schoorel 6–2, 6–4

Women's singles 

  Arantxa Rus def.  Carina Witthöft 4–6, 6–2, 6–2

Men's doubles 

  Antal van der Duim /  Boy Westerhof def.  Simon Greul /  Wesley Koolhof 4–6, 6–3, [12–10]

Women's doubles 

  Cindy Burger /  Daniela Seguel def.  Demi Schuurs /  Eva Wacanno 6–4, 6–1

External links 
 

2013
2013 ATP Challenger Tour
2013 ITF Women's Circuit
2013 in Dutch tennis